The women's 3 metre springboard diving competition at the 2014 South American Games in Santiago was held on 16 March at the Aquatic Center National Stadium.

Schedule
All times are Chile Summer Time (UTC−03:00)

Results

References 

Detailed Results

Diving at the 2014 South American Games